John Thompson (21 June 1938 – 11 February 1999) was an Australian rules footballer who played with Richmond in the Victorian Football League (VFL).

Career
Thompson, a centre half-back originally from Benalla, was on a permit from Ararat when he came to Richmond in the 1959 VFL season and made three league appearances. The following year Ararat cleared him to Richmond, on the agreement that he would cleared back if he didn't become a regular member of the side. He was however able to cement a spot in the team and played 62 more games for Richmond, over four years, which included a stint as vice captain. During his time at Richmond, Thompson had a full-time job in Ararat and had to travel 500 miles to train. 

After leaving Richmond, Thompson was captain-coach of Mortlake in the Hampden Football League and got the club into a grand final in 1966, which they lost to Warrnambool. He led Mortlake to another grand final in 1967 and they were again unable to get the win, this time going down to Terang.

Later life
Thompson worked in the legal profession and also had involvement in the racing industry.

He died on 11 February 1999, aged 60.

References

External links

1938 births
Australian rules footballers from Victoria (Australia)
Richmond Football Club players
Benalla Football Club players
Ararat Football Club players
Mortlake Football Club players
Mortlake Football Club coaches
1999 deaths